is an action role-playing video game developed and published by Level-5 for the Nintendo Switch. As indicated by the name, it is the fourth game of the main series of Yo-kai Watch video games; unlike the preceding Yo-kai Watch 3, 4 was initially released only as a single version in Japan in June 2019. An enhanced version titled Yo-kai Watch 4++ was released for the Switch and PlayStation 4 in Japan in December 2019. Its full name is "Yo-kai Watch 4: We're Looking Up At The Same Sky", translated from  "妖怪ウォッチ4: ぼくらは同じ空を見上げている".

As with the other games in the series, the protagonist possesses the eponymous Yo-kai Watch, a device that allows them to see, befriend, and summon creatures called Yo-kai. Yo-kai Watch 4 is set in three distinct time periods. Characters from the first three games, including Nathan Adams and Katie Forester, are in one time period. Another time period is set 30 years after the other main series games, using playable characters that were introduced in the Yo-kai Watch Shadowside: Oni-ō no Fukkatsu film, including Natsume Amano, the daughter of Nate and Katie. The final time period is set in the 1960s, approximately 30 years prior to the other games, with characters from the Yo-kai Watch: Forever Friends movie, including Shin Shimomachi.

Gameplay

The game takes place in three separate worlds, each associated with one of the main characters: Natsume (30 years after the first three games), Nate (contemporaneous with the first three games), and Shin (30 years prior to the first three games).

Yo-kai Watch 4 introduced a new free-roaming 3D overworld movement system that is more akin to standard 3D RPG games, unlike the previous games that were from a top-down perspective. The game also implemented a new battle system where similar to other action role-playing games, players can directly control playable characters to battle enemies unlike where the previous games sent only befriended Yo-kai into battle. An active party can be formed with up to 1 human and 3 Yo-kai characters and players may switch freely between human and Yo-kai characters during battle. Yo-kai characters in the party that are not controlled by the player will behave differently in battle depending on their personality, a system similar to previous Yo-kai Watch games. In addition, human characters absorb the element "Yo-ki" during the battle for redistribution, either to attack enemy Yo-kai, or to heal party members. Four characters from the Yo-kai Watch Shadowside anime also appear in the game: Natsume Amano, her brother Keisuke Amano, Akinori Arihoshi, and Touma Tsukinami.
Gameplay footage was released at Tokyo Game Show 2018. Compared to the prior games in the series, which were all released for Nintendo 3DS, Yo-kai Watch 4 uses 3D rendering for both overworld exploration in Sakura New Town and battle scenes. To aid navigation, a Naviwoof (taking the appearance of a ghostly dog) will lead players to their destination.

Synopsis

Development
Level-5 announced in April 2018 that Yo-kai Watch 4 was under development for Nintendo Switch, with a planned Japanese release in 2018. Although the game was initially scheduled for release in winter 2018, the release date slipped to spring 2019 for quality issues before being released in Japan on June 20, 2019.

Localization 
During the Anime Expo in July 2019, Level-5 abby replied to a Q&A about a future Western release of Yo-kai Watch 4 and showed the Japanese trailer with English subtitles. Because the game's plot refers to concepts and details that were introduced in the Shadowside and Forever Friends films, which have not yet been given official English-language releases, the marketing company expressed an interest in localizing those films as well. However, as of October 2020, a combination of flagging sales for the series and Level-5's decision to shutter their North American operations, including Level-5 Abby, has led many commentators and journalists to bring in doubt of the possibility of a localization ever happening.

Yo-kai Watch 4++ 
Level-5 announced that certain Yo-kai, a new map, and a multiplayer mode would be made available via downloadable unlocks by August 2019. Some of the downloadable content would require an additional purchase, while others were available as pre-sale bonuses for related items, such as tickets for the upcoming Yo-kai Gakuen Y: Neko wa Hero ni Nareru ka film. The August 9 update 1.30 included sumo battles and a new yo-kai, Yamakasa.

An enhanced version named Yo-kai Watch 4++ was released for both Nintendo Switch and Sony PlayStation 4 on December 5, 2019, in Japan. 4++ includes new features and additions such as a new map and enemies, as well as a multiplayer mode, "Purapura Blasters". The content included in 4++ was also available for existing owners of the original game as a paid download. The release marked the first time a Yo-kai Watch game was released on a non-Nintendo platform, the PlayStation 4. The release also added language options for traditional and simplified Chinese.

Sales
Although it was the best-selling game in Japan during its initial week of release, Yo-kai Watch 4 had the worst sales in the series to date; with 150,721 copies sold between June 17 and June 23, 2019. During its second week, it was displaced by the debuts of Super Mario Maker 2 and Jikkyou Powerful Pro Yakyuu, selling an additional 40,376 copies for third place. It remained in third place the following week, with 19,407 copies sold. It sold 291,878 copies in Japan in the year 2019.

The ++ rerelease of the game did even worse, selling only 10,333 copies in its first week at retail on Nintendo Switch alone, missing the Top 10 of that week's sales charts, and the PlayStation 4 version not even placing in the Top 30. The Nintendo Switch version remained in the Top 30 of weekly Japanese sales for only seven weeks, having sold a total of 60,890 copies by its exit.

Reception

Yo-kai Watch 4 was positively reviewed in Famitsu, scoring 37/40. The follow-up 4++ received a similarly positive score of 36/40 in Famitsu.

References

External links
 

2019 video games
Nintendo Switch games
PlayStation 4 games
Cancelled Nintendo 3DS games
Japan-exclusive video games
Role-playing video games
Video games developed in Japan
Video games set in Japan
Level-5 (company) games
Yo-kai Watch video games